Sylvia Riley, better known by her pen-name Carol Lake, is an English author. She was the winner of the Guardian Fiction Prize in 1989 with Rosehill: Portrait from a Midlands City. She also wrote Switchboard Operators, upon which the BBC drama series The Hello Girls was based.

During the 1960s, Riley was a member of the International Marxist Group in Nottingham, where she lived and worked at the bookshop run by Pat Jordan.

Works

References

1944 births
Living people
English women novelists
20th-century pseudonymous writers
21st-century pseudonymous writers
Pseudonymous women writers
20th-century English novelists
21st-century English novelists